The  is a Japanese railway line between Mizuma Kannon Station and Kaizuka Station, all within Kaizuka, Ōsaka. This is the only railway line of a private railway company  operates. The company also operates bus services.

The company or the line is commonly called .

Basic data
Distance: 
Gauge: 
Stations: 10
Track: single
Electric supply: 1,500 V DC
Railway signalling: Automatic

History
The line opened between December 1925 and January 1926, electrified at 600 VDC.

Freight services ceased in 1972, and in 1990 the line voltage was increased to 1,500 VDC.

Proposed connecting line
 Sechigo station - Construction of a proposed line to Kokawa on the Wakayama Line commenced in the late 1920s but was abandoned due to the economic depression in the 1930s

Stations
All stations are in Kaizuka, Osaka, Osaka Prefecture.

See also
List of railway companies in Japan
List of railway lines in Japan

References
This article incorporates material from the corresponding article in the Japanese Wikipedia

External links 
 Mizuma Railway official website

Railway lines in Japan
Rail transport in Osaka Prefecture
Railway lines opened in 1925
1067 mm gauge railways in Japan